is a Japanese actress, voice actress and singer of Korean descent affiliated with LAL. She graduated from the Toho Gakuen College of Drama and Music and studied Korean at the Korean Language Institute (한국어학당) in Yonsei University. She won numerous awards, including the Best Actress Award at the 1st Seiyu Awards.

Park is known for her roles as tough, calm and mature preteen or teenage boys who are often called prodigies in their fictional universes (for example, Tao Ren, Ken Ichijouji, Tōshirō Hitsugaya, Edward Elric, Kosuke Ueki and Natsume Hyūga). Her female roles also fit the "tough lady/punk girl" archetype (Temari, Nana Osaki and Teresa of the Faint Smile).

Personal life
Park was born in Edogawa, Tokyo. She entered the theater department at Toho Gakuen College of Drama and Music where she graduated in 1992. She later studied at the Korean language school in Yonsei University. In 1993, she joined the Institute for Drama, and two years later she was promoted as a member of the theater group Yen in 1995.

On January 22, 2020, which was the same day as her 48th birthday, she announced on her official website and Twitter that she had married to Kazuhiro Yamaji.

Career
In 1998, she made her voice acting debut as Kanan Gimms in the anime series Brain Powerd.

Additional performances 
In 2006, Park sang and released a CD. In 2016, Park was scheduled to appear in the Box Contents 2016 theater, but she did not participate as a result of poor physical condition. On November 15, 2017, she left the Yen theater group she had been with for 22 years, and established the entertainment and voice actor office LAL. In August 2018, she read the Your Name audiobook. In 2019, she made her first musical appearance as Madame Thenardier in Les Misérables.

Accolades 
2003: Voice Actor award, 26th Anime Grand Prix.

2004: Voice Actor Award, Tokyo International Anime Fair 2004.

2006: Best Actress Award for Nana as Nana Osaki, 1st Seiyu Awards.

2013: starred in a live-action film Akaboshi, which was nominated for a viewpoint at the 25th Tokyo International Film Festival.

Filmography

Anime

Theatre

Film

Drama CD

Video games

Tokusatsu

Live-action

Dubbing roles

Live action

Animation

Notes

References

External links 

  
  
 Official agency profile 
 
 

1972 births
Living people
Avex Group artists
Aoni Production voice actors
Japanese contraltos
Japanese actresses of Korean descent
Japanese musical theatre actresses
Japanese people of South Korean descent
Japanese video game actresses
Japanese voice actresses
Japanese women pop singers
People from Edogawa, Tokyo
People from Tokyo
South Korean women pop singers
South Korean voice actresses
Toho Gakuen School of Music alumni
Voice actresses from Tokyo
20th-century Japanese actresses
21st-century Japanese actresses
21st-century Japanese singers
21st-century Japanese women singers
20th-century South Korean actresses
21st-century South Korean actresses
21st-century South Korean singers